Major League Baseball (MLB) is a professional baseball organization, which consists of a total of 30 teams—15 teams in the National League (NL) and 15 in the American League (AL). The NL and AL were formed in 1876 and 1901, respectively. Beginning in 1903, the two leagues cooperated but remained legally separate entities until 2000 when they merged into a single organization led by the Commissioner of Baseball. These records do not include results from by a team's playing time in the National Association of Professional Base Ball Players or while members of any minor league.

The New York Yankees have the highest regular season winning percentage, with .570. The San Francisco Giants have the most overall wins (11,301), while the Tampa Bay Rays have the fewest (1,826). The Philadelphia Phillies have the most losses, with 11,112, while the Arizona Diamondbacks have the fewest, with 1,946. With  21,769 games played, the Chicago Cubs have played more games than any other MLB club. Conversely, Tampa Bay has played the fewest (3,784). San Francisco has recorded the most ties in MLB history, with 163. Tie games do not count toward MLB standings, and they have become particularly rare since the advent of a 2007 rule change assuring that a tie game can occur only if it is the last scheduled matchup between the two teams that season and has no bearing on the postseason.

The New York Yankees have the most postseason wins (241), while the Colorado Rockies have the fewest (10). The Yankees also have the most postseason losses (172), while Miami and Colorado are tied for the fewest (14).

Table key

Regular season

 Last updated on September 10, 2022.

Postseason

See also
List of Major League Baseball franchise postseason droughts

Notes

References
Specific

General

Notes

Win-loss records
MLB